The girls' big air event in snowboarding at the 2020 Winter Youth Olympics took place on 21 and 22 January at the Leysin Park & Pipe.

Qualification
The qualification was held on 21 January at 13:00.

Final
The final was held on 22 January at 14:50.

References

Girls' big air